Kontraritam (The Counterbeat) is the first and only studio album by the Serbian 2 tone ska band Kontraritam, released by Jugoton in 1982. The album is the first ska studio album in former Yugoslavia. It was never rereleased and is today considered a rarity and a collector's item. The track from the album, "Žožo, vrati se ", appeared on the Jugoton various artists compilation Vrući dani i vrele noći, and the track "Sretne noge" appeared on the various artists compilation Niko kao ja - jugoslovenski novi talas in 1994.

Tracklsiting

Personnel 
 Boris Oslovčan — bass guitar
 Dimitrije Radulović — bass guitar, backing vocals - 
 Robert Radić — drums
 Horvat Žolt — guitar
 Sreten Kovačević — producer, alto saxophone, guitar, backing vocals
 Jan Pavlov — vocals, organ 
 Srđan Vejvoda — photography
 Ivan Vlatković — recorded by

References 
 Kontraritam self-titled LP at Discogs
 Bogomir Mijatović, NS rockopedija, novosadska rock scena 1963-2003, SWITCH, 2005

1982 debut albums
Jugoton albums
Kontraritam albums